The Brilliant Branch Railroad Bridge is a truss bridge that carries Allegheny Valley Railroad's Brilliant Branch across the Allegheny River between the Pittsburgh neighborhood of Highland Park and the borough of Aspinwall, Pennsylvania.

History

The Brilliant Branch, along with the Port Perry Branch along the Monongahela River was built by the Pennsylvania Railroad as part of a bypass of the narrow tracks around Downtown Pittsburgh. 
After the collapse of the Penn Central Transportation Company (the PRR's successor company) in 1976, the Brilliant Branch was abandoned. In 1995, they were purchased by the fledgling Allegheny Valley Railroad and in 2003, the Brilliant Branch Bridge was reopened. It generally served one train per day in each direction.

See also 
 
 
 
 List of crossings of the Allegheny River
 Bridges of Pittsburgh
 Brilliant Cutoff Viaduct of the Pennsylvania Railroad

References

External links

 Brilliant Cutoff Bridge at bridgehunter.com

Railroad bridges in Pennsylvania
Bridges over the Allegheny River
Bridges in Allegheny County, Pennsylvania
Bridges in Pittsburgh
Bridges completed in 1904
Truss bridges in the United States